An uncertain plural occurs when a writer does not know in advance whether a word should be written in the singular or plural.  For English nouns, this may be demonstrated by enclosing the trailing s in parentheses, such as "book(s)".

In the case of articles, "they" or "their" may be used to include a single individual, when uncertain.

See also 
 Singular they
 Gender-neutral pronoun

Language

fr:They singulier
no:They som entall